Der Weg (German: The Way) was a far right monthly magazine which was published in Buenos Aires, Argentina, in the period 1947–1957. Its subtitle was Monatshefte zur Kulturpflege und zum Aufbau (German: Monthly Bulletin for Cultivation and Building Up).

History and profile
Der Weg was launched in Buenos Aires as a monthly magazine in 1947. The founding publishing company was Dürer Verlag which was owned by Eberhard Fritsch who also edited Der Weg. Over time it became a radical right-wing magazine and functioned as a forum for the advocates of the national-socialist, fascist and conservative philosophies. The goal was to revive national socialism. The contributors of the magazine which enjoyed the privileges granted by Argentine President Juan Perón included well-known far right figures who were either former Nazi officials or were from other countries such as Per Engdahl, Helmut Sündermann, Johann von Leers, Hans-Ulrich Rudel, Peter Kleist, Anton Zischka Hans Fritzsche, Hans W. Hagen and Maurice Bardèche. The magazine also featured messages of Haj Amin al-Husseini, Grand Mufti of Jerusalem, and was the major media outlet for holocaust deniers.

There were many correspondents of Der Weg which at its peak, had an international circulation of 25,000 copies. It was distributed not only in South America, but also in Germany and Austria where it reached the former National Socialists. The magazine went bankrupt and folded in 1957. One of the reasons for its shutdown was the end of Juan Perón's presidency in 1955.

References

1947 establishments in Argentina
1957 disestablishments in Argentina
Antisemitism in Argentina
Antisemitic publications
Defunct political magazines
Defunct magazines published in Argentina
Fascist newspapers and magazines
German-language magazines
Holocaust denial
Magazines established in 1947
Magazines disestablished in 1957
Magazines published in Buenos Aires
Monthly magazines published in Argentina
Neo-Nazism in Argentina
Political magazines published in Argentina